Purpureocillium atypicola is a species of fungus, previously known as Nomuraea atypicola, in the family Ophiocordycipitaceae with no subspecies listed in the Catalogue of Life. There are records of this mushroom from Japan, Australia and New Zealand.

References

External links
 
 

Fungi of Asia
Ophiocordycipitaceae
Fungi described in 1915